The National Trust Party (AMANAH), is a registered political party in Malaysia advocating a reformist strand of political Islam. The party was founded as the Malaysia Workers' Party before being handed over in August 2015 to Gerakan Harapan Baru, a group of progressive Islamist leaders of the Pan-Malaysian Islamic Party which lost in the June 2015 party election. This group of Islamists then redefined the Malaysia Workers' Party as an Islamic reformist party on 16 September 2015. The party currently has eight elected Members of Parliament. It is one of the four component parties of the ruling coalition in Malaysia called Pakatan Harapan.

History

Malaysian Workers' Party (PPPM) 
The Malaysian Workers' Party was founded in January 1978 by Ganga Nayar, the first female to head a political party in Malaysia. Nayar was its lone candidate for the 1978 general election in the Sungei Besi parliamentary constituency and the Sungei Way state constituency. She performed poorly and lost her deposits in both contests. Since then, the Workers' Party contested very few Malaysian elections.

The symbol or logo of the Workers' Party was the hoe and gear with the dark green background.

The Workers' Party was dormant until it was taken over by Gerakan Harapan Baru on 31 August 2015.

Takeover by the Gerakan Harapan Baru 
GHB took over the Workers Party after its attempt to form a new party called Parti Progresif Islam was rejected by the Home Ministry. Gerakan Harapan Baru was given permission to take over the party, with the only condition given by the existing party members that the party would not co-operate with the Barisan Nasional coalition and UMNO.

GHB chief Mohamad Sabu said they would then change the Workers' Party's name to the National Trust Party. Once the Registrar of Societies approved the new name, it was expected that the Amanah party would be launched on 16 September in conjunction with Malaysia Day, with at least 35,000 members.

Rebranding to Parti Amanah Negara 
Malaysian Workers' Party members approved the change of its name to Parti Amanah Negara in an extraordinary general meeting on 8 September 2015, resulting in the change of its logo and flag.

AMANAH was officially launched on 16 September 2015 at the national level, while it was still awaiting the Registrar of Societies' approval. AMANAH is taking over and rebranding the Workers' Party into a new political party spearheaded by progressive leaders, who have left PAS.

The new logo and flag was unveiled at its official launch on 16 September 2015.

Ideology and political positions 
The ideology of the party is best described as progressive Islamism, indicating a commitment to Islamic political ideals but in a more progressive and liberal democratic manner. In addition to common reformist stance and rhetoric held by PH, the party remains socially conservative in line with Sharia law, such as prohibition of liquors and gambling. The party has stated that Muslims should not force Islamic values on non-Muslims. However, individual members of the party have called for abrogation of any law and court decision should they contradict with Sharia.

Party Organisational Structure (2019–2022) 

 General Advisor:
 Ahmad Awang
 Deputy General Advisor:
 Abdul Ghani Shamsudin
 President:
 Mohamad Sabu
 Deputy President:
 Salahuddin Ayub
 Vice-Presidents:
 Mahfuz Omar
 Mujahid Yusof
 Hasanuddin Mohd Yunus
 Siti Mariah Mahmud
 Adly Zahari
 Women's Chief:
 Aiman Athirah Al-Jundi
 Youth Chief:
 Hasbie Muda
 Women's Youth Chief:
 Nurthaqaffah Nordin
 Secretary-General:
 Mohd Hatta Md Ramli
 Treasurer-General:
 Izham Hashim
 Organising Secretary:
 Abang Ahmad Kerdee Abang Masagus
 Communications Director:
 Khalid Abdul Samad
 Elections Director:
 Asmuni Awi
 Strategic Director:
 Dzulkefly Ahmad
 Human Resources Development Director:
 Suhaizan Kaiat
 Syariah Affairs Director:
 Zolkharnain Abidin 

 Central Leadership Committee Members:
 Muhammad Faiz Fadzil
 Mazlan Aliman
 Nik Omar Nik Abdul Aziz
 Ridzuan Abu Bakar
 Wan Abd Rahim Wan Abdullah
 Mohamed Hanipa Maidin
 Mohd Sany Hamzan
 Mariam Abdul Rashid
 Ahmad Termizi Ramli
 Hasan Bahrom
 Zulqarnain Lukman
 Hu Pang Chaw
 Pushpa Nagiah Vengadesan
 Muhaimin Sulam
 Haris Alimudin
 State Chairpersons:
 Federal Territories: Mohd Hatta Md Ramli
 Johor: Aminolhuda Hassan
 Kedah: Ismail Salleh
 Kelantan: Khalid Abdul Samad
 Melaka: Adly Zahari 
 Negeri Sembilan: Mk Ibrahim Abdul Rahman
 Pahang: Zulkifli Mohamed
 Penang: Roslan Ahmad
 Perak: Asmuni Awi
 Perlis: Wan Kharizal Wan Khazim
 Sabah: Lahirul Latigu 
 Sarawak: Abang Abd Halil Abang Naili
 Selangor: Izham Hashim
 Terengganu: Raja Kamarul Bahrin Shah Raja Ahmad

Elected representatives

Dewan Negara (Senate)

Senators 

 His Majesty's appointee:
 Hasbie Muda
 Mohd Hatta Ramli

Dewan Rakyat (House of Representatives)

Members of Parliament of the 15th Malaysian Parliament 

AMANAH has 8 members in the House of Representatives:

Dewan Undangan Negeri (State Legislative Assembly)

Malaysian State Assembly Representatives 

Selangor State Legislative Assembly
Kedah State Legislative Assembly
Negeri Sembilan State Legislative Assembly
Penang State Legislative Assembly

Perak State Legislative Assembly
Johor State Legislative Assembly
Malacca State Legislative Assembly

Perlis State Legislative Assembly
Terengganu State Legislative Assembly
Pahang State Legislative Assembly

Kelantan State Legislative Assembly
Sabah State Legislative Assembly
Sarawak State Legislative Assembly

General Election results

State election results

See also 
 :Category:National Trust Party (Malaysia) politicians
 List of political parties in Malaysia
 Malaysian General Election
 Politics of Malaysia
 Pakatan Harapan

References

External links 

 
 

 
Political parties in Malaysia
Islamic political parties in Malaysia
Socialist parties in Malaysia
1978 establishments in Malaysia
Political parties established in 1978